Kobel (or Koebel, Köbel) is a Swiss-German surname. People with this name include:

Craig Kobel (born 1982), American football player
Eberhard Koebel (1907–1955), German youth leader, writer, publisher, tent designer, and Nazi resister
Gregor Kobel (born 1997), Swiss footballer
Jacob Köbel (1462–1533), German printer and publisher
Kevin Kobel (born 1953), American Baseball pitcher
Maria Kobel (1897–1996), German biochemist
Peter Kobel (born 1969), Swiss footballer
Stefan Kobel (born 1974), Swiss beach volleyball player
Walter Köbel (1918–1965), German politician